Cyborg 009 is a manga series written and illustrated by Shotaro Ishinomori. It has been published by many Japanese magazines, including Monthly Shōnen King, Weekly Shōnen Magazine, Shōnen Big Comic, COM, Shōjo Comic, Weekly Shōnen Sunday, Monthly Shōnen Jump, and Monthly Comic Nora from July 19, 1964 to 1981. It was published in North America by Tokyopop. On October 12, 2012, comiXology announced that they acquired the digital distribution rights to Shotaro Ishinomori's catalogue, including Cyborg 009.

Volume list

References

Cyborg 009
Cyborg 009